Cincinnati shooting may refer to:

Cincinnati riots of 2001, a series of riots that occurred after the fatal shooting of Timothy Thomas, an African American man, by Cincinnati police
Shooting of Samuel DuBose, the fatal shooting of an African American man by University of Cincinnati police in 2015
Cincinnati nightclub shooting, a mass shooting at a nightclub that killed two people, including a gunman
2018 Cincinnati shooting, a mass shooting at the Fifth Third Center that killed four people, including the gunman